Docking Module may refer to:

 Docking Compartment, mostly implied for space stations
 Docking Module for Mir